James Griffin Jax (born November 22, 1994) is an American professional baseball pitcher for the Minnesota Twins of Major League Baseball (MLB). He made his MLB debut in 2021. He is also an officer in the United States Air Force Reserve.

Amateur career
Jax attended Cherry Creek High School in Greenwood Village, Colorado. In 2013, his senior year, he went 7–1 with a 1.74 ERA and was named Colorado's Gatorade Baseball Player of the Year. He was selected by the Philadelphia Phillies in the 12th round of the 2013 Major League Baseball draft, but did not sign and instead enrolled at the United States Air Force Academy where he played college baseball for the Air Force Falcons.

Jax struggled during his first two years at the Air Force Academy, pitching to a 5.86 ERA as a freshman and a 5.17 ERA as a sophomore. He broke out as a junior in 2016, starting 15 games and going 9–2 with a school-record 2.05 ERA, striking out ninety and walking only ten in  innings. He was named the Mountain West Conference Co-Pitcher of the Year alongside Jimmy Lambert.

Professional career
After his junior year, Jax was selected by the Minnesota Twins in the third round of the 2016 Major League Baseball draft. He signed for $645,000 and made his professional debut with the Elizabethton Twins of the Rookie-level Appalachian League, pitching  innings. In 2017, he pitched in only five games before he was required to report Cape Canaveral, Florida for active duty. In those five starts, he went 2–2 with a 2.61 ERA between Elizabethton and the Cedar Rapids Kernels of the Class A Midwest League. In 2018, he was granted membership into the United States military's World Class Athlete Program, allowing him to make Olympic training his full-time responsibility (which counts towards his five years of required active duty) which in turn allowed him to play in the minor leagues full-time. During the season, he pitched for the Fort Myers Miracle of the Class A-Advanced Florida State League, going 3–4 with a 3.70 ERA in 15 games (14 starts). After the season, he played in the Arizona Fall League.

Jax began 2019 with the Pensacola Blue Wahoos of the Class AA Southern League with whom he was named an All-Star. While with Pensacola, he missed nearly three weeks due to fatigue. In August, Jax was promoted to the Rochester Red Wings of the Class AAA International League, with whom he finished the season. Over 23 starts between the two clubs, Jax pitched to a 5–7 record with a 2.90 ERA, striking out 94 over  innings. Jax did not play a minor league game in 2020 due to the cancellation of the minor league season caused by the COVID-19 pandemic. To begin the 2021 season, he was assigned to the St. Paul Saints of the Triple-A East.

On June 5, 2021, Jax was selected to the 40-man roster and promoted to the major leagues for the first time. Jax made his MLB debut three days later on June 8 in relief at home against the New York Yankees, becoming the first Air Force Academy graduate in MLB history (he is still a captain in the Air Force Reserve). He pitched one inning, giving up three earned runs on two home runs while also registering his first strikeout versus Tyler Wade.

Personal life
Jax's father, Garth Jax played for 10 seasons in the NFL for the Dallas Cowboys and the Arizona Cardinals in the mid-1980s to the mid-1990s.

Jax is currently pursuing a graduate degree in business administration from Colorado State University.

Jax and his wife, Savannah, married in January 2021 in Gilbert, Arizona. Savannah holds the rank of captain in the Air Force.

References

External links

Air Force Falcons bio

1994 births
Living people
People from Englewood, Colorado
Baseball players from Colorado
Major League Baseball pitchers
Minnesota Twins players
Air Force Falcons baseball players
Elizabethton Twins players
Cedar Rapids Kernels players
Fort Myers Miracle players
Salt River Rafters players
Pensacola Blue Wahoos players
Rochester Red Wings players
St. Paul Saints players
United States Air Force officers
United States Air Force reservists
Military personnel from Colorado
U.S. Army World Class Athlete Program
Eau Claire Express players